Richard Abell (c.1688 – aft. March 1744) was a British lawyer and Whig politician who sat in the House of Commons from 1720 to 1727.

Abell was the eldest son of William Abell, of East Claydon, Buckinghamshire and his wife Elizabeth ?Mayne. He was admitted at Emmanuel College, Cambridge in 1705. He was called to the bar as a member of the Inner Temple in 1714.

Abell was returned unopposed as Member of Parliament for Richmond, Yorkshire at a by-election in 1720. He was a Whig and stood in the interest of the Duke of Wharton. At the 1722 general election he was returned as MP for Aylesbury. He did not stand for Parliament again in 1727 or later. In 1728, he sold the manor of East Claydon to the Viscount Fermanagh, retaining a life interest in the property.

References

1680s births
Alumni of Emmanuel College, Cambridge
British MPs 1715–1722
British MPs 1722–1727
Members of the Inner Temple
Members of the Parliament of Great Britain for English constituencies
Whig (British political party) MPs for English constituencies
1744 deaths
Year of death unknown